Gajanan is a given name. Notable people with the name include:

Gajanan Maharaj, saint from Shegaon, Maharashtra, India
Gajanan Jagirdar (1907–1988), veteran Indian film director, screenwriter and actor
Gajanan Kirtikar, Leader of Shiv Sena Party in Mumbai, Maharashtra, India
Gajanan Dharmshi Babar, member of the 15th Lok Sabha of India
Gajanan Digambar Madgulkar (1919–1977), Marāthi poet, lyricist, writer and actor from India
Gajanan Tryambak Madkholkar (1900–1976), Marathi novelist and a literary critic from Maharashtra, India
Gajanan Madhav Muktibodh (1917–1964), Hindi poet, essayist, literary and political critic and fiction writer

See also
Gajanan Maharaj Temples
Gajanan Maharaj Temple, Indore
Gajanan Maharaj Temple, Kanhor
Shri Sant Gajanan Maharaj College of Engineering, Shegaon, Maharashtra, India
Shegavicha Rana Gajanan, Marathi film released in 2004
Gajanan Vijay, a spiritual book written in Marathi language by Saint Shree Dasganu
Gajan (disambiguation)
Gajana